Frederic Fokejou Tefot (born 3 December 1979 in Bafoussam, Cameroon) is a Cameroonian weightlifter. He competed at the 2012 Summer Olympics in the +105 kg event.

References

1979 births
Living people
People from Bafoussam
Cameroonian male weightlifters
Olympic weightlifters of Cameroon
Weightlifters at the 2012 Summer Olympics
20th-century Cameroonian people
21st-century Cameroonian people